Ennio Zelioli Lanzini (8 February 1899 – 8 February 1976) was an Italian politician that become President of the Senate in 1967.

Life and career

Born in San Giovanni in Croce son of a school teacher, he participated in World War I as an officer of the Regio Esercito. In 1921 he graduated in law in Pavia then began his political activities but he was forced to stop his activities by the fascist regime. In 1943 he joined the partigiani and in 1948 he was elected into the Senate for first time. In 1960 he was elected Vice President of the Senate for the first time and in 1964 he acted as President of the Senate because Cesare Merzagora was an Interim President of the Republic.

In 1967 he was elected President of the Senate but after new elections he was not reelected as President of the Senate. In 1968 he was for a brief time Minister of Health in 1972 Zilioli-Lanzini decided not to seek re-election.
Zelioli-Lanzini died in 1976.

References

1899 births
1976 deaths
Presidents of the Province of Cremona
20th-century Italian lawyers
Presidents of the Italian Senate
20th-century Italian politicians
Italian Ministers of Health